Boyuk Zira Lighthouse is a lighthouse in the north of Boyuk Zira Island, in the Caspian Sea, Azerbaijan.

History 

The lighthouse in the island was begun to function since 1884. It illuminated road for ships entering Bay of Baku. Until 1907, Maiden Tower executed these functions. But later, Nargin Island detaching Baku Bay from the sea, became the main guide for sailors. A kerosene-wick burner, and then a gas lantern with a light-optic apparatus of the 4th degree illuminated a road for ships.
The Nargin lighthouse illuminated by acetylene in 1912, became the first lighthouse in the Russian Empire illuminated by such a way.

In the beginning of the Great Patriotic War, Nargin lighthouse was exploded for not to attract attention of German aviation, and fixed antiaircraft guns in the island. In 1958, Nargin lighthouse was restored and acts up to now.

See also 
 List of lighthouses in Azerbaijan

References

External links 
 

Lighthouses in Azerbaijan